Craig Harrison (born 10 November 1977) is an English professional football manager and former player who is currently manager of Cymru Premier side The New Saints.

In his seven-year playing career, in which he played in defence, he played for Middlesbrough, Preston North End and Crystal Palace.

From 2008, until his departure in 2011, he was the manager of Airbus UK Broughton. He then joined The New Saints as their new manager that same year. In June 2017, Harrison was appointed as the manager of Hartlepool United.

Early life
Harrison was born in Gateshead, Tyne and Wear.

Playing career
He is a product of the youth system at Middlesbrough, where he made a number of appearances during the 1997-98 promotion season under Bryan Robson. He was unfortunate not to play in the 1998 League Cup final, having been Boro's left-back in the three league games immediately before the final. However, he did play the full match as the club sealed promotion with a 4–1 final day win over Oxford United. He also started the club's first game back in the Premier League. Whilst at the club he had loan spells with Preston North End in 1999 and Crystal Palace in August 2000.

He joined Crystal Palace permanently the following month, and over the next two years made 34 league appearances for the club. In January 2002, he suffered a double compound fracture in his left leg whilst playing for the club's reserves against Reading. After nineteen months in rehabilitation and three operations, he subsequently retired from professional football in 2003. After retirement he battled depression and worked on property renovation and resale.

Managerial career

Early career
In the spring of 2008, he was appointed assistant manager of Welsh Premier League side Airbus UK Broughton after a chance meeting with the then manager Gareth Owen. In the summer of 2008, Harrison was appointed manager. In January 2010, he announced he was registering himself as a player for the club. He subsequently became director of football at the club.

The New Saints
In December 2011, Harrison was unveiled as director of football and manager of The New Saints

In his first season, he oversaw TNS being crowned the 2011–12 Welsh Premier League Champions, as well as the winning the Welsh Cup. He won the Welsh Premier League again in the 2013–2014 season, before securing the Welsh Premier League for the third year running and becoming the first team in Europe to win their domestic league.

In May 2017, he was named Welsh Premier League manager of the season, having led the side to their sixth successive Welsh Premier League title, as well as the Welsh League Cup and breaking Ajax's 44-year-old world record for the longest winning streak in top-flight football.

Hartlepool United
On 26 May 2017, Harrison was appointed as manager of newly relegated National League club Hartlepool United.

Harrison was awarded the National League's manager of the month award for October 2017. Following only one victory since late November, Harrison left his position as manager in February 2018.

Bangor City
On 23 May 2018, Harrison was appointed as manager of Bangor City following their relegation from the Welsh Premier League after failing to obtain a tier one license. On 19 October the same year he left the club to go to Connah's Quay as first team coach. He stated a desire to return to full-time work as the key factor behind his decision.

Connah's Quay Nomads
In October 2018, Harrison joined the coaching staff at Connah's Quay Nomads following his departure from Bangor City.

In September 2021, Harrison was appointed manager of Connah's Quay following the resignation of Andy Morrison.

Managerial statistics

Honours

As a manager
Welsh Premier League: 2011–12, 2012–13, 2013–14, 2014–15, 2015–16, 2016–17
Welsh Cup: 2011–12, 2013–14, 2014–15, 2015–16
Welsh League Cup: 2014–15, 2015–16, 2016–17

References

External links

1977 births
Living people
Footballers from Gateshead
English footballers
Association football defenders
Middlesbrough F.C. players
Preston North End F.C. players
Crystal Palace F.C. players
Premier League players
English Football League players
English football managers
Airbus UK Broughton F.C. managers
The New Saints F.C. managers
Hartlepool United F.C. managers
Bangor City F.C. managers
Cymru Premier managers
National League (English football) managers
Connah's Quay Nomads F.C. managers